Marshallton United Methodist Church is a historic United Methodist church located at 1105 Stanton Road in Marshallton, New Castle County, Delaware. The original portion was built in 1886 as a one-room, 30-foot by 50-foot center-aisle plan frame structure with a gable roof.  It sits on a foundation of "Brandywine Granite", a commonly found local building stone. In 1922, a 30-foot by 45-foot gabled frame addition was added on the east side of the original building. At the same time, Gothic arched commemorative stained glass windows and a bell tower were added. A three-story brick educational building and fellowship hall were added between 1949 and 1957.

It was added to the National Register of Historic Places in 1986.

References

External links

Marshallton United Methodist Church website

19th-century Methodist church buildings in the United States
Churches completed in 1886
Churches in New Castle County, Delaware
Churches on the National Register of Historic Places in Delaware
National Register of Historic Places in New Castle County, Delaware
United Methodist churches in Delaware